The National Building Research Organisation (NBRO) is a Sri Lankan government research and development institute established in 1984. The organisation is responsible for various programmes to assist a disaster-free built environment in the future.

References

External links
National Building Research Organisation

1984 establishments in Sri Lanka
Government agencies established in 1984
Government agencies of Sri Lanka
Research institutes established in 1984
Building research